North Omaha Airport  is a privately owned, public-use airport eight miles northwest of Omaha, in Douglas County, Nebraska.

Facilities
North Omaha Airport covers 100 acres (40 ha) at an elevation of 1,324 feet (404 m). Its one runway, 17/35, is 3,173 by 40 feet (967 x 12 m) concrete.

In the year ending August 29, 2018 the airport had 14,250 general aviation aircraft operations, average 39 per day. 57 aircraft were then based at the airport: 87% single-engine and 13% helicopter.

The Omaha Police Department's air support unit was based at the airport from 1997–2019.

References

External links 

 Aerial image as of 4 April 1999 from USGS The National Map

Transportation in Omaha, Nebraska
Airports in Nebraska
Buildings and structures in Omaha, Nebraska
North Omaha, Nebraska